Shehab Mamdouh Mamdouh Abdelfadel Ellethy (born 18 April 2000) is a Qatari footballer who plays as a goalkeeper for Al-Duhail.

Career statistics

Club

Notes

References

External links

2000 births
Living people
Qatari footballers
Aspire Academy (Qatar) players
Lekhwiya SC players
Al-Duhail SC players
Al Kharaitiyat SC players
Qatar Stars League players
Qatari Second Division players
Association football goalkeepers
Naturalised citizens of Qatar
Qatari people of Egyptian descent
Qatar under-20 international footballers
Qatar youth international footballers